is a Japanese anime television series produced by Doga Kobo and Toho, directed by Takashi Naoya and written by Pierre Sugiura, with character designs by Junichiro Taniguchi and music composed by Kenji Kawai. It is based on the video game Touken Ranbu. A compilation film titled Touken Ranbu: Hanamaru ~Makuai Kaisōroku~ premiered in December 2017. An anime film trilogy titled Toku Touken Ranbu: Hanamaru ~Setsugetsuka~ premiered from May to September 2022.

Plot
The year is 2205. The "historical retrograde army" have begun attacks on the past in their plot to change history. The Saniwa, who have been charged with protecting history, can imbue life into objects. Strongest among these are the Token Danshi, swordsmen who had originally lived as legendary swords. The story centers around their cheerful lives.

Characters

Season 1

Season 2

Anime
The first season aired from October 3 to December 19, 2016. Funimation has licensed Touken Ranbu: Hanamaru for an English language release. A sequel was announced at the Hanamaru Biyori! special event in Japan on February 5, 2017. The second season aired from January to March 2018.

Season 1 (2016)

Season 2 (2018)

Films
Before the airing of the second season, a compilation film titled Touken Ranbu: Hanamaru ~Makuai Kaisōroku~ premiered in Japanese theaters on December 1, 2017.

During the "Touken Ranbu: Hanamaru Special Event: Hanamaru Haru Ichiban!", it was announced that the series is receiving a new film trilogy titled Toku Touken Ranbu: Hanamaru ~Setsugetsuka~.  The first film, Yuki no Maki premiered on May 20, 2022, the second film, Tsuki no Maki premiered in July 8, 2022, and the third film, Hana no Maki premiered in September 1, 2022.

References

External links
 Anime official website 
 

Action anime and manga
Anime television series based on video games
Comedy anime and manga
Crunchyroll anime
Doga Kobo
Funimation
Historical fantasy anime and manga
Toho Animation